Dorcadion variegatum is a species of beetle in the family Cerambycidae. It was described by Ludwig Ganglbauer in 1884. It is known from Turkey and Syria.

References

variegatum
Beetles described in 1884